The Sharp Memorial Outpatient Pavilion opened on the Sharp Metropolitan Medical Campus in 2003, aiming to provide cancer treatment, general imaging, women's imaging, outpatient surgery, endoscopy services, education and wellness programs and a health library to the greater San Diego area.

Features
Sharp Memorial Outpatient Pavilion is the most comprehensive outpatient center in San Diego. Located in the Serra Mesa area, the facility offers a variety of services and includes a community health library and the Cushman Wellness Center.

Services
• Cancer Institute
• Cushman Wellness Center
• Cushman Wellness Center Community Health Library
• Diabetes Education Program
• Executive Health Program
• Health Assessments
• Integrative Medicine
• LASIK Surgeries
• Orthopedic Surgeries
• Outpatient Imaging Center
• Outpatient Surgery Center
• Sharp Vision Laser Center
• Summerfelt Endoscopy Center
• Virtual Colonoscopy
• Women's Imaging Services

Medical firsts
In 2003, Sharp Memorial Outpatient Pavilion opened and was the first comprehensive, multispecialty outpatient center in San Diego.

References

Buildings and structures completed in 2003
Hospitals in San Diego
Companies based in San Diego